Kierzków may refer to the following places in Poland

Kierzków, Lublin Voivodeship
Kierzków, West Pomeranian Voivodeship